Mansionair is an Australian indie electronic trio formed in 2014. Mansionair signed with Glassnote Records and have released several singles including "Easier", "Astronaut - Something About Your Love", and "Violet City", which landed on the Billboard Rock Airplay charts. In 2017, their collaboration with Odesza and WYNNE, "Line of Sight", charted on the US Alternative Songs and Dance/Electronic Songs charts. Their first full-length album, Shadowboxer, was released on 1 March 2019.

Mansionair's second studio album, Happiness, Guaranteed was released on 29 April 2022.

Discography

Studio albums

EPs

Singles

As featured artist

References

External links
 

Australian electronic music groups
Australian indie rock groups
Musical groups established in 2014
Musical groups from Sydney
2014 establishments in Australia
Living people
Year of birth missing (living people)
Glassnote Records artists